Joseph "Joey" Arthur Gibbs (born 13 June 1992) is an Australian football (soccer) player who plays for Keflavík.

Career
Gibbs made his senior A-League debut as a substitute for Sydney FC in the 2010 Grand Final against the Melbourne Victory. He was the youngest player to play in an A-League grand final. It was reported that he had signed for Olympic Charleroi in the Belgian Third Division B.

After his stint in Belgium, Gibbs returned to Australia where he signed with his former NSW Premier League club Manly United for the 2011 season.

He played for the Marconi Stallions in the NSW Premier League for the duration of the 2012 season where he was selected in team of the season and helped Marconi to win the Australian state league grand final.

Joey Gibbs came on as a substitute in Western Sydney's first official game, where he achieved an impressive 4 goals in one half. On 3 October 2012, just three days before their first match of the season, Gibbs signed a one-year deal with new A-League club Western Sydney Wanderers. He was released by the Wanderers along with Dino Kresinger, Tarek Elrich, and Rocky Visconte at the conclusion of the 2012–13 A-League season.

On 13 May 2013, Gibbs signed with the Newcastle Jets for the 2013/14 season. In his debut for the Newcastle Jets, he came on in the 88th minute and his first touch was a goal.

In early 2014, he joined APIA Leichhardt in the National Premier Leagues NSW, before making a move to Hong Kong Premier League side Tai Po FC.

Gibbs returned to Australia to join Blacktown City FC for the 2015 season.

Achievements
Gibbs was the recipient of the 2008 Lucas Neill scholarship award.

Honours
Sydney FC
A-League Championship: 2009–10

Manly United
Waratah Cup: 2011

Marconi Stallions
National Premier Leagues NSW Championship: 2012

Blacktown City
National Premier Leagues: 2015
National Premier Leagues NSW Championship: 2016
National Premier Leagues NSW Premiership: 2015

Keflavík
1. deild karla: 2020

Individual
John Kosmina Medal: 2015
1. deild karla top-goalscorer: 2020

References 

1992 births
Living people
People from Gosford
Sportsmen from New South Wales
Soccer players from New South Wales
Association football forwards
Australian soccer players
Sydney FC players
R. Olympic Charleroi Châtelet Farciennes players
Western Sydney Wanderers FC players
Marconi Stallions FC players
Newcastle Jets FC players
APIA Leichhardt FC players
Tai Po FC players
Manly United FC players
Blacktown City FC players
Knattspyrnudeild Keflavík players
A-League Men players
National Premier Leagues players
Úrvalsdeild karla (football) players
Australian expatriate soccer players
Australian expatriate sportspeople in Belgium
Australian expatriate sportspeople in Hong Kong
Australian expatriate sportspeople in Iceland
Expatriate footballers in Belgium
Expatriate footballers in Hong Kong
Expatriate footballers in Iceland